Albert Joris (born 17 June 1915, date of death unknown) was a Belgian sprint canoeist who competed in the late 1930s.

Joris competed in the K-2 1000 m at the 1936 Summer Olympics in Berlin, and was eliminated in the heats.

References
Sports-Reference.com profile

External links

1915 births
Year of death missing
Belgian male canoeists
Canoeists at the 1936 Summer Olympics
Olympic canoeists of Belgium
20th-century Belgian people